McFarland High School may refer to:

McFarland High School (Wisconsin), in McFarland, Wisconsin
McFarland High School (California), in McFarland, California